Seroto is a community council located in the Mohale's Hoek District of Lesotho, Africa. Its population in 2006 was 7,836.

Villages
The community of Seroto includes the villages of: 
 
 Foreisetata (Ha Letsaba)
 Ha 'Meta
 Ha Bakhafi
 Ha Bati
 Ha Bolae
 Ha Damane
 Ha Hlalele
 Ha Hou
 Ha Jobo
 Ha Katse
 Ha Khoalinyane
 Ha Korone
 Ha Laene
 Ha Makara
 Ha Makatla
 Ha Marame
 Ha Mathibeli
 Ha Matsoelipane
 Ha Mohlakoana
 Ha Mokhoabane
 Ha Molobeli
 Ha Moremang
 Ha Motlohi
 Ha Motseki
 Ha Ntsene
 Ha Ntsuku
 Ha Pata
 Ha Pokola
 Ha Potso
 Ha Qoboko
 Ha Rabele
 Ha Ralimpe
 Ha Ramakholela
 Ha Ramasimong
 Ha Ramosothoane
 Ha Ranti
 Ha Raseboto
 Ha Salae
 Ha Seaka
 Ha Sefehle
 Ha Sefoboko
 Ha Selebalo
 Ha Sepenya
 Ha Sephoko
 Ha Seturumane
 Ha Shakhane
 Ha Shoele
 Ha Thabo Matete
 Ha Thamahanyane
 Ha Thetsinyane
 Ha Thobei (Khohlong)
 Hohobeng
 Kheseng
 Khothong (Ha Mapou)
 Khubetsoana
 Koung (Ha Maepho)
 Koung (Ha Motlatsi)
 Koung (Matebeleng)
 Lekhalong
 Lekhalong (Ha Rasephokoana)
 Lekhalong (Tiping)
 Lekokong
 Letlapeng
 Letsatsing
 Lihlolong
 Linotšing
 Lithipeng
 Litšepeng
 Makhetheng
 Malinakana
 Matebeleng
 Matlakeng
 Mechalleng
 Mofufutsong
 Mohlakeng
 Moru-Motšo
 Morunyaneng
 Motheoaneng
 Motuoaneng
 Ntlhasinye
 Paballong
 Phocha
 Qiloane
 Sekhutlong
 Thaba-Chitja
 Thaba-Sephara
 Thabana-Tšooana
 Thabaneng
 Thepung
 Tšoeneng and Tšoeu-e'a-penya

References

External links
 Google map of community villages

Populated places in Mohale's Hoek District